Gundrum is a surname. Notable people with the surname include:

Mark Gundrum (born 1970), American politician 
Rick Gundrum, American politician and businessman